Events from the year 1990 in the United States.

Incumbents

Federal government 
 President: George H. W. Bush (R-Texas)
 Vice President: Dan Quayle (R-Indiana)
 Chief Justice: William Rehnquist (Wisconsin)
 Speaker of the House of Representatives: Tom Foley (D-Washington)
 Senate Majority Leader: George J. Mitchell (D-Maine)
 Congress: 101st

Events

January
 January 2 – The Dow Jones Industrial Average closes above 2,800 for the first time ever.
 January 3 – United States invasion of Panama: General Manuel Noriega, the deposed "strongman of Panama", surrenders to American forces.
 January 5 – The National Gallery of Art purchases The Fall of Phaeton by Peter Paul Rubens.
 January 9–20 – The Space Shuttle Columbia flies STS-32.
 January 10 – Time Warner is formed from the merger of Time Inc. and Warner Communications Inc.
 January 13 – Douglas Wilder becomes the first elected African American governor as he takes office in Richmond, Virginia.
 January 15 – Martin Luther King Day Crash – Telephone service in Atlanta, St. Louis, and Detroit, including 9-1-1 service, goes down for nine hours, due to an AT&T software bug.
 January 17 – Smith & Wesson introduce the .40 S&W cartridge.
 January 18
 In Washington, D.C., Mayor Marion Barry is arrested for drug possession in an FBI sting.
 In California, the McMartin preschool trial, the longest criminal trial in U.S. history, ends with all defendants being acquitted on charges of child molesting.
 January 22 – Robert Tappan Morris, Jr. is convicted of releasing the Morris worm.
 January 24
 Richard Secord is sentenced to two years probation for lying to the United States Congress about the Iran–Contra affair.
 In Miami, William Lozano, a Hispanic police officer, is sentenced to seven years in prison for shooting a black motorcyclist in 1989, an event that had set off three days of rioting.
 January 25 – Avianca Flight 52 crashes into Cove Neck, Long Island, New York, killing 73, after a miscommunication between the flight crew and JFK Airport officials.
 January 28 – The San Francisco 49ers defeat the Denver Broncos in Super Bowl XXIV.
 January 29
 The trial of Joseph Hazelwood, former skipper of the Exxon Valdez, begins in Anchorage, Alaska. He is accused of negligence that resulted in America's worst oil spill to date.
 In Holmdel, New Jersey, scientists at Bell Labs announce they have created a digital optical processor that could lead to the development of superfast computers that use pulses of light rather than electric currents to make calculations.
 January 31
 President of the United States George H. W. Bush gives his first State of the Union address and proposes that the U.S. and the Soviet Union make deep cuts to their military forces in Europe.
 Cold War: The first McDonald's in Moscow, Russia opens.

February

 February 9 – The owners of Major League Baseball announce a lockout because of a salary dispute with players.
 February 11 – James "Buster" Douglas knocks out Mike Tyson to win the World Heavyweight Boxing crown.
 February 13 – Drexel Burnham Lambert files for Chapter 11 bankruptcy protection. 
 February 14 – The Pale Blue Dot picture was sent back from the Voyager 1 probe after completing its primary mission, it was about 6 billion km (3.7 billion miles) from Earth.
 February 19 – The United Mine Workers reach a deal with the Pittston Company to end the Pittston Coal strike that had gone on since April 5, 1989; most striking coal miners return to work on February 26.
 February 25 – A smoking ban takes effect on all domestic U.S. flights of less than six hours.
 February 27 – Exxon Valdez oil spill: Exxon and its shipping company are indicted on five criminal counts.
 February 28 
 The Space Shuttle Atlantis begins STS-36.
 The 5.7  Upland earthquake hits the Greater Los Angeles Area with a maximum Mercalli intensity of VII (Very strong), causing $12.7 million in losses and 30 injuries.

March
 March – Greyhound bus drivers strike for higher pay.
 March 1
Steve Jackson Games is raided by the U.S. Secret Service, prompting the later formation of the Electronic Frontier Foundation.
 The Nuclear Regulatory Commission approves a license for the long-delayed Seabrook Station Nuclear Power Plant.
 March 6 – An SR-71 sets a U.S. transcontinental speed record of 1 hour 8 minutes 17 seconds, on what is publicized as its last official flight.
 March 9 – Antonia Novello is sworn in as Surgeon General of the United States, becoming the first female and Hispanic American to serve in the position.
 March 18
Twelve paintings, collectively worth from $100 to $300 million, are stolen from the Isabella Stewart Gardner Museum in Boston, Massachusetts by two robbers posing as police officers. It is the largest art theft, and the largest theft of private property, ever; the paintings have not been recovered.
 Major League Baseball players and owners agree to a new four-year contract, ending the lockout begun on February 15.
 March 22 – A jury in Anchorage, Alaska finds Joseph Hazelwood guilty of misdemeanor negligence for his role in the Exxon Valdez oil spill. He is sentenced to pay $50,000 in restitution and to spend 1,000 hours cleaning oily beaches.
 March 25 – In New York City, a fire due to arson at an illegal social club called "Happy Land" kills 87.
 March 26 – The 62nd Academy Awards, hosted by Billy Crystal, are held at Dorothy Chandler Pavilion in Los Angeles, with Bruce Beresford's Driving Miss Daisy winning four awards out of nine nominations, including Best Picture. Jessica Tandy, at 80, becomes the oldest actress to win Best Actress and the oldest person to win for acting until 2012. Oliver Stone wins his second Best Director award for Born on the Fourth of July. The telecast garners over 40 million viewers.
 March 27 – The United States begins broadcasting TV Martí to Cuba.
 March 28 – U.S. President George H. W. Bush posthumously awards Jesse Owens the Congressional Gold Medal.

April

 April 2 – The UNLV Runnin' Rebels basketball team defeats the Duke Blue Devils men's basketball team to win the 1990 NCAA Men's Division I Basketball Tournament.
 April 6 – Robert Mapplethorpe's "The Perfect Moment" show of nude and homosexual photographs opens at the Cincinnati Contemporary Art Center, in spite of accusations of indecency by Citizens for Community Values.
 April 7 – Iran-Contra Affair: John Poindexter is found guilty of five charges for his part in the scandal; the convictions are later reversed on appeal.
April 8 – Ryan White, who made headlines after being expelled for contracting AIDS, dies from the disease at the age of 18.
 April 9 – Sigma Lambda Gamma National Sorority, Inc. is established.
 April 17–18 – President Bush meets with representatives of 17 countries and two international organizations at the White House to discuss global warming and other environmental issues.
 April 20 – STS-31: The Hubble Space Telescope is launched aboard Space Shuttle Discovery.
 April 23 – Lebanon hostage crisis: Lebanese kidnappers release American educator Robert Polhill, who had been held hostage since January 1987.
 April 24 – Investor Michael Milken pleads guilty to six felonies and agrees to pay $600 million in fines and restitution.
 April 25 – The Space Shuttle Discovery places the Hubble Space Telescope into orbit.
 April 28 – A Chorus Line, the longest-running musical in Broadway history, closes after 6,137 performances.
 April 30 – Lebanon hostage crisis: Lebanese kidnappers release American educator Frank H. Reed, who had been held hostage since September 1986.

May
 May 13 – In the Philippines, gunmen kill two United States Air Force airmen near Clark Air Base on the eve of talks between the Philippines and the United States over the future of American military bases in the Philippines.
 May 19 – The U.S. and the Soviet Union agree to end production of chemical weapons and to destroy most of their stockpiles of chemical weapons.
 May 22 – Microsoft releases Windows 3.0.
 May 24 – The Edmonton Oilers defeat the Boston Bruins in the 1990 Stanley Cup Finals for their fifth Stanley Cup.
 May 30 – President Bush and Mikhail Gorbachev begin a four-day summit meeting in Washington, D.C.

June

 June – The last month of the 1980s business cycle expansion, at the time the second-longest expansion in American history (the 1960s expansion was a year longer), comes to an end; the unemployment rate is 5.2%.
 June 1
Cold War: U.S. President George H. W. Bush and Soviet Union leader Mikhail Gorbachev sign the Chemical Weapons Accord to end chemical weapon production and begin destroying their respective stocks.
 The Dow Jones Industrial Average closes above 2,900 for the first time ever.
 June 2 – The Lower Ohio Valley tornado outbreak spawns 88 confirmed tornadoes in Illinois, Indiana, Kentucky, and Ohio, killing 12; Thirty-seven tornadoes occur in Indiana, eclipsing the previous record of 21 during the 1974 Super Outbreak.
 June 7 
Nickelodeon Studios opens.
Universal Studios Florida opens to the public.
 June 9 – Mega Borg oil spill in the Gulf of Mexico near Galveston, Texas.
 June 11
 Nolan Ryan pitches his sixth career no-hitter.
 In United States v. Eichman, the Supreme Court overturns a 1989 federal law that made it illegal to burn the United States flag.
 June 14 – 1990 NBA Finals: The Detroit Pistons defeat the Portland Trail Blazers.
 June 17–30 – Nelson Mandela tours North America, visiting three Canadian cities and eight U.S. cities.
 June 18 – James Edward Pough kills 10 and injures six before committing suicide at a General Motors car loan office in Jacksonville, Florida.
 June 22 – The United States Fish and Wildlife Service declares the spotted owl a threatened species.
 June 25 – In Cruzan v. Director, Missouri Department of Health, the Supreme Court allows public officials to intervene in questions of termination of life support in the absence of an advance healthcare directive.
 June 26 – President George H. W. Bush reneges on his 1988 "no new taxes" campaign pledge in a statement accepting tax revenue increases as a necessity to reduce the budget deficit. This later becomes a factor in the 1992 presidential election.

July
 July – The United States enters the early 1990s recession.
 July 2 – A U.S. District Court acquits Imelda Marcos on racketeering and fraud charges.
 July 4 – SK8-TV debuts on Nickelodeon.
 July 9–11 – The 16th G7 Summit is held in Houston.
 July 19 – Pete Rose is sentenced to five months in prison after pleading guilty to filing false tax returns.
 July 20
 A federal appeals court overturns three convictions of Oliver North.
 William J. Brennan, Jr. resigns from the Supreme Court for health reasons.
 July 25 – The United States Senate votes to reprimand Senator David Durenberger for improper financial dealings and orders him to pay restitution.
 July 26
 U.S. President George H. W. Bush signs the Americans with Disabilities Act, designed to protect disabled Americans from discrimination.
 The United States House of Representatives votes to reprimand Rep. Barney Frank for conduct stemming from his relationship with a male prostitute.
 July 28 – A fire at a generating plant knocks out power to 40,000 homes in Chicago's west side. Power is restored by July 31.

August
 August 2
Gulf War: Iraq invades Kuwait, eventually leading to the Gulf War.
Federal prosecutors indict Rep. Floyd H. Flake and his wife on 17 counts of conspiracy, fraud and tax evasion.
 August 6 – Gulf War: The United Nations Security Council orders a global trade embargo against Iraq in response to its invasion of Kuwait.
 August 9 – Yosemite National Park closes temporarily because of forest fires.
 August 10 – The Magellan enters orbit around Venus.
 August 12 – "Sue", the best preserved Tyrannosaurus rex specimen ever found, is discovered near Faith, South Dakota by Sue Hendrickson.
 August 18 – In New York City, a jury finds three teenagers guilty of raping and assaulting a woman in Central Park in April 1989. On September 11, they are sentenced to 5–10 years in prison.
 August 19 – Leonard Bernstein conducts his final concert, ending with Ludwig van Beethoven's Symphony No. 7 performed by the Boston Symphony Orchestra.
 August 26–28 – In Gainesville, Florida, police find five murdered college students, apparently killed by a serial killer.
 August 28 – The Plainfield Tornado (F5 on the Fujita scale) strikes the towns of Plainfield, Crest Hill, and Joliet, Illinois, killing 29 people (the strongest tornado to date to strike the Chicago Metropolitan Area).

September

 September 8 – Fox Kids, a children's programming block, debuts on Fox.
 September 9
 President Bush and Soviet President Gorbachev meet in Helsinki to discuss the Persian Gulf crisis.
 After six years of renovations, Ellis Island reopens as an immigration museum.
 Pete Sampras, age 19, wins the 1990 US Open, becoming the youngest person to ever win the event.
 September 11 – Gulf War: President George H. W. Bush delivers a nationally televised speech in which he threatens the use of force to remove Iraqi soldiers from Kuwait.
 September 12 – Cold War: The two German states and the Four Powers sign the Treaty on the Final Settlement With Respect to Germany in Moscow, paving the way for German reunification.
 September 14 – Scientists at the National Institutes of Health in Bethesda, Maryland begin the first gene therapy on a human patient.
 September 17 – United States Secretary of Defense Dick Cheney fires Gen. Michael Dugan, Chief of Staff of the United States Air Force, for publicly discussing plans to bomb Iraq.
 September 18
 The International Olympic Committee awards the 1996 Summer Olympics to Atlanta, Georgia.
 Charles Keating is indicted on charges in connection with the 1989 failure of the Lincoln Savings and Loan Association.
 September 24 – President Bush meets with President of South Africa F. W. de Klerk at the White House, the first time a South African head of government had visited the U.S. since 1945.
 September 26 – The Motion Picture Association of America replaces its X rating with a new NC-17 rating.
 September 29 – Washington National Cathedral is completed after 83 years of construction.
 September 30 – The New Revised Standard Version of the Bible is published in the United States.

October
 October 2 – The Senate confirms David Souter to the Supreme Court; he takes his seat on October 9.
 October 3 – In Fort Lauderdale, Florida, a jury convicts a record store owner of obscenity for selling an album by 2 Live Crew. On October 20, a second jury finds 2 Live Crew not guilty of obscenity on charges stemming from a June 1990 performance.
 October 5 – In Cincinnati, a jury finds an art museum and its art director innocent of breaking obscenity laws for displaying sexually explicit photographs by Robert Mapplethorpe.
 October 6 – STS-41: The Space Shuttle Discovery lifts off and launches the Ulysses on a mission to study the sun.
 October 6–8 – The federal government temporarily halts all non-essential services after Congress fails to enact a new budget and President Bush vetoes a stop-gap spending measure.
 October 9 – Leonard Bernstein announces his retirement from conducting after 47 years. He dies five days later.
 October 20 – The Cincinnati Reds defeat the Oakland Athletics, 4 games to 0, to win their 5th World Series Title.
 October 22
 President Bush vetoes a civil rights bill that would have strengthened federal protection against job discrimination, arguing that it would lead to race and gender-based quotas.
 In Orange County, California, a judge denies a surrogate mother's request for parental rights to a child she bore for another couple.
 October 24 – United States Secretary of Labor Elizabeth Dole announces her resignation.
 October 25 – Evander Holyfield defeats James "Buster" Douglas to become the heavyweight boxing champion.
 October 27 – Congress passes the Clean Air Act of 1990.

November
 November – Rhode Island banking crisis begins.
 November 5 
President George H. W. Bush signs the Omnibus Budget Reconciliation Act of 1990, which includes tax increases despite his "no new taxes" pledge.
Rabbi Meir Kahane, founder of the far-right Kach movement, is shot dead after a speech at a New York City hotel.
 November 6
In the congressional elections, Democrats increase their majorities in both houses of Congress.
Sharon Pratt Kelly is elected Mayor of the District of Columbia, becoming the first black woman to head a major U.S. city. She takes office January 2, 1991.
 November 8 – William Bennett resigns as Director of the Office of National Drug Control Policy.
 November 11 – Stormie Jones, the Texas girl who had been the world's first recipient of a simultaneous heart and liver transplant in 1984, dies at a Pittsburgh hospital at age 13.
 November 15 – STS-38: Space Shuttle Atlantis is launched on a classified military mission.
 November 16
President Bush leaves on a trip to Europe and the Middle East; he spends Thanksgiving with U.S. troops in Saudi Arabia.
Walt Disney Feature Animation's 29th feature film, The Rescuers Down Under, is released. A sequel to 1977's The Rescuers and the first theatrically-released Disney sequel, it received positive reviews but struggled at the box office as it opened the same day as Home Alone.
 November 21 – Financier Michael Milken is sentenced to 10 years in prison.
 November 27 – The National Football League fines the New England Patriots and three of its players for the sexual harassment of reporter Lisa Olson.
 November 29 – Gulf War: The United Nations Security Council passes UN Security Council Resolution 678, authorizing military intervention in Iraq if that nation does not withdraw its forces from Kuwait and free all foreign hostages by January 15, 1991.

December

 December – The unemployment rate rises to 6.3%, the highest since May 1987.
 December 1 – Quarterback Ty Detmer of the BYU Cougars football wins the Heisman Trophy.
 December 2 – STS-35: Space Shuttle Columbia begins a mission that ends on December 10, a day earlier than planned, ending a mission plagued with computer and plumbing problems.
 December 2–8 – President Bush visits Brazil, Uruguay, Argentine, Chile, and Venezuela.
 December 3 – At Detroit Metropolitan Airport, Northwest Airlines Flight 1482 (a McDonnell Douglas DC-9) collides with Northwest Airlines Flight 299 (a Boeing 727) on the runway, killing eight passengers and four crew members on Flight 1482.
 December 11 – A dense fog overwhelms an interstate near Calhoun, Tennessee, damaging ninety-nine vehicles, injuring forty-two people, and killing a dozen, making it one of the worst automobile accidents in American history.
 December 11 – American mob boss John Gotti is arrested.
 December 14 – President Bush names Lynn Morley Martin to replace Elizabeth Dole as Secretary of Labor.
 December 17 – President Bush names Lamar Alexander as United States Secretary of Education, replacing Lauro Cavazos, who resigned on December 12.
 December 25 – The Godfather Part III opens in theaters.

Date unknown
 Center for Personalized Education for Physicians is established in Colorado.
 EMBARC, a Motorola business enterprise is established.
 Flometrics, a San Diego engineering solutions company is formed.
 Outcomes Research Consortium, an international clinical research group is formed in California.
 Paragon Innovations, a Richardson, Texas engineering firm is founded.
 Silicon Valley Microelectronics is founded in California.
 Songs of Hope Summer Camp is founded in Minnesota.
 Uptown Station opens in Normal, Illinois.

Ongoing
 Cold War (1947–1991)
 Gulf War (1990–1991)

Births

January

 January 1 – Xavier Avery, baseball player
 January 3 – Dahmar Wartts-Smiles, hurdler
 January 6 – Natalie Palamides, voice actress
 January 7 
 Camryn Grimes, actress
 Liam Aiken, actor
 Michael Sam, football player
 January 8 – Jeff Allen, football player
 January 9
 Justin Blackmon, football player
 Melissa Ricks, Filipino-born actress
 January 10 – John Carlson, ice hockey player
 January 11 – Ryan Griffin, football player
 January 14
 Kacy Catanzaro, wrestler and gymnast
 Grant Gustin, actor and singer
 January 15
 Chris Warren Jr., actor
 Luke Willson, football player
 January 18 – Zeeko Zaki, Egyptian-born actor
 January 21
 Kelly Rohrbach, model and actress
 Jacob Smith, actor
 January 22
 Yousef Erakat, youtuber
 Logic, rapper, singer/songwriter, and record producer
 January 25 – Daniel Hernández Jr., politician
 January 26
 Kherington Payne, dancer and actress
 Christopher Massey, actor
 January 29
 Charlie Cipriano, lacrosse player
 Nick Moody, football player
 Brandon Taylor, football player
 January 30
 Ryan Scott Graham, bassist for State Champs
 Jake Thomas, actor
 January 31 – Nate Augspurger, rugby player

February

 February 2 – Julia Fox, actress and model
 February 3 – Sean Kingston, singer
 February 4 – Zach King, internet personality, filmmaker, and illusionist
 February 6 – Jermaine Kearse, football player
 February 7 – Dalilah Muhammad, Olympic hurdler
 February 8
 Christian Madsen, actor
 Ben Schnetzer, actor
 Klay Thompson, basketball player
 February 9 – Camille Winbush, actress
 February 10 – Trevante Rhodes, actor
 February 11 – Q'orianka Kilcher, German-born actress and activist
 February 12 – Robert Griffin III, football player
 February 14 
 Jake Weary, actor
 Emily Mae Young, actress
 February 18 – Scott Anderson, racing driver
 February 22
 Kyle Greig, soccer player
 Travis Releford, basketball player
 February 23
 Shelby Blackstock, race car driver
 Tom Brandt, soccer player
 Olivia Jean, singer
  February 24 
 Jason Coats, baseball player
 Caleb McSurdy, football player
 Derek Wolfe, football player
 February 26 – Chris Banjo, football player
 February 27
 Lindsey Morgan, actress
 Megan Young, Filipino-born actress, model, television host, and beauty contest title holder

March

 March 4
 Andrea Bowen, actress
 Draymond Green, basketball player
 March 6 – Demitrius Bronson, football player and pro wrestler
 March 7 – Chase Owens, pro wrestler
 March 8
 Kristinia DeBarge, singer/songwriter
 Abigail and Brittany Hensel, conjoined twins
 March 9 – YG, rapper and actor
 March 10 – Ryan Nassib, football player
 March 11 – Reiley McClendon, actor
 March 13 – Emory Cohen, actor
 March 15
 Lauren Barfield, volleyball player
 Siobhan Magnus, singer
 March 18
 Michael J. Knowles, conservative political commentator 
 Luke Tarsitano, actor
 March 22
 Sophie Caldwell, cross-country skier
 Claire Huangci, classical pianist
 March 24
 Lacey Evans, wrestler
 JonTron, Youtuber/Reviewer
 March 25 – Kiowa Gordon, actor
 March 26
 James Buescher, stock car driver
 Carly Chaikin, actress
 March 28 – Laura Harrier, actress and model
 March 29 – Timothy Chandler, German-born soccer player
 March 30
 Thomas Rhett, singer/songwriter
 Matt Simpson, Paralympic goalball player
 Corey Cott, actor and singer
 Cassie Scerbo, actress, singer, and dancer

April

 April 1 – Justin Hamilton, Croatian-born football player
 April 2
 Roscoe Dash, rapper and singer
 Madman Fulton, pro wrestler
 April 3 – Madison Brengle, tennis player
 April 6 – Charlie McDermott, actor
 April 8
 Kind Butler III, sprinter
 TimTheTatman, livestreamer
 April 9 – Kristen Stewart, actress and director
 April 10 – Maren Morris, country singer
 April 11 – Darrius Garrett, American-born Rwandan basketball player
 April 16 
 Tony McQuay, Olympic sprinter
 Lorraine Nicholson, actress
 Travis Shaw, baseball player
 April 18 – Britt Robertson, actress
 April 21 – Bree Essrig, actress
 April 22 – Machine Gun Kelly, actor, rapper, and singer
 April 23 – Matthew Underwood, actor
 April 24 – Carly Pearce, country singer
 April 27 – Austin Dillon, stock car driver
 April 28 – Chelsea Stewart, soccer player
 April 29
 Bradford Burgess, basketball player
 Chris Johnson, basketball player

May

 May 2
 Paul George, basketball player 
 Kay Panabaker, actress
 May 3
 Harvey Guillén, actor
 Brooks Koepka, golfer
 May 5
 Hannah Davis, model
 Michele Fitzgerald, television personality
 May 6
 Moses Storm, writer and comedian
 Caitlin Yankowskas, figure skater
 May 7 – Jonathan Zlotnik, politician
 May 8 – Kemba Walker, basketball player
 May 9 – John McEntee, political advisor
 May 10
 Brandun DeShay, rapper and record producer
 Lauren Potter, actress
 May 11 – Taylor Fletcher, Olympic Nordic combined skier
 May 12
 Etika, YouTuber, rapper, and model (d. 2019)
 Jacory Harris, football player
 Shungudzo, singer and television personality
 May 14
 Amber Portwood reality television personality and criminal
 Sasha Spielberg, musician
 May 16
 I o, DJ and record producer (d. 2020)
 Marc John Jefferies, actor
 May 17
 Will Clyburn, basketball player
 Ross Butler, actor
 Kree Harrison, singer
 Leven Rambin, actress
 May 18 – Luke Kleintank, actor
 May 24 – Joey Logano, race car driver
 May 25
 Bo Dallas, wrestler
 Jarred Cosart, baseball player
 Ryan Sherriff, baseball player
 May 26 – Eric Griffin, basketball player
 May 27 – Chris Colfer, actor
 May 29 – Erica Garner, civil rights activist (d. 2017)
 May 30 – Dean Collins, actor
 May 31 – Phillipa Soo, actress and singer

June

 June 2 – Brittany Curran, actress and singer
 June 4
 Zac Farro, musician, singer/songwriter, and multi-instrumentalist, and drummer for Paramore
 Evan Spiegel, co-founder and CEO of Snap Inc.
 June 5 – Kyle Pavone, singer and co-frontman for We Came As Romans (d. 2018)
 June 6
Mike G, rapper and member of Odd Future
Ryan Higa, YouTube personality
Anthony Rendon, baseball player
 June 7 – Allison Schmitt, Olympic swimmer
 June 10 – Tristin Mays, actress and singer
 June 12
 Kevin Wu, blogger, activist, and humanitarian
 Jrue Holiday, basketball player
 June 15 – Denzel Whitaker, actor
 June 16 – Austin Krajicek, tennis player
 June 18
 Monica Barbaro, actress
 Christian Taylor, Olympic triple jumper 
 June 19 
 Ashly Burch, actress, singer, and writer
 Xavier Rhodes, American football player
 June 20
 Colin Schmitt. politician
 Jacob Wysocki, actor and comedian
 June 22
Quinton Coples, American football player
T. J. DiLeo, American-German basketball player
 June 23 – Rodney McLeod, American football player
 June 27 – Bobby Wagner, American football player
 June 30 – David Wise, freestyle skier

July

 July 2
 Grey Henson, actor, dancer, and singer
 Kayla Harrison, judoka
 July 4 – Kelsi Crain, model, Miss Louisiana 2010
 July 6
 Jourdana Phillips, model
 Jeremy Suarez, actor
 July 7 – Amadeus Serafini, actor
 July 8 – Randy Brown, American-born Jamaican mixed martial artist
 July 10 – Mike LiPetri, politician
 July 11
 Dan Colman, poker player
 Connor Paolo, actor
 Patrick Peterson, football player
 Kelsey Sanders, actress
 July 16 – James Maslow, singer, actor, dancer
 July 12
 Rachel Brosnahan, actress
 Chasen Shreve, baseball player
 July 15
 Tyler Honeycutt, basketball player (d. 2018)
 Damian Lillard, basketball player
 July 16 – James Maslow, actor and singer
 July 18 – Mandy Rose, pro wrestler
 July 19
 Armond Rizzo, gay pornographic actor
 Steven Anthony Lawrence, actor
 Darlington Nagbe, Liberian-born soccer player
 July 24 – Daveigh Chase, actress
 July 26 – Zach Kornfeld, internet personality
 July 27
 Victoria Aveyard, writer
 Nick Hogan, television personality
 July 28 – Soulja Boy, rapper
 July 29
 Matt Prokop, actor
 Evan Edinger, blogger
 July 30 – Molly McCook, actress
 July 31 – Ruby Modine, actress, dancer, and singer

August

 August 2 – Eddie Generazio, author and musician
 August 5 – Patrick Reed, professional golfer
 August 6 – JonBenét Ramsey, beauty queen and murder victim (d. 1996)
 August 7 – Tate Forcier, football player
 August 8 – Tommy Bracco, actor, reality television star, and Broadway performer
 August 10
 Will Brittain, actor
 Lucas Till, actor
 August 13 – DeMarcus Cousins, basketball player
 August 14 – Miranda Rae Mayo, actress
 August 15 
Jennifer Lawrence, actress
Justin Pugh, American football player
 August 20 – Bradley Klahn, tennis player
 August 21 – Bo Burnham, comedian and musician
 August 22 – Adam Thielen, football player
 August 23 – Mike Yastrzemski, baseball player
 August 24 – Jeffrey Vinokur, chemist and dancer
 August 25 – Max Muncy, baseball player
 August 27
 Tori Bowie, Olympic long jumper and runner
 Adam Metzger, musician, member of AJR
 August 29 – Nicole Gale Anderson, actress

September

 September 3 – Keaton Pierce, singer and frontman for Too Close to Touch (d. 2022)
 September 4 – Eric LeGrand, football player
 September 6
 Matt McAndrew, singer/songwriter
 John Wall, basketball player
 September 8
 Matt Barkley, football player
 Ella Rae Peck, actress
 September 9 – Haley Reinhart, singer
 September 10
 Eddy Martin, actor
 Chandler Massey, actor
 September 13 – Jamie Anderson, Olympic snowboarder
 September 15 – Matt Shively, actor
 September 19 – Patrick Breeding, singer
 September 20 – Phillip Phillips, singer
 September 21
 Cory Wade Hindorff, model, actor, singer/songwriter, Gay activist, and spokesperson
 Allison Scagliotti-Smith, actress
 Christian Serratos, actress
 September 27 – Dion Lewis, football player
 September 28 – Jasper Dolphin, rapper, actor, and stunt performer
 September 29 – Doug Brochu, actor, comedian, and voice actor
 September 30 – Shane Strickland, wrestler

October

 October 1 – IDubbbz, youtuber
 October 2 – Barbi Hayden, wrestler
 October 6 – Jordan Hamilton, basketball player
 October 7 – Ayla Kell, actress
 October 8 – Trent Harmon, singer
 October 12 – Brock Coyle, football player
 October 13 – Bailey Noble, actress
 October 14 – Shaul Guerrero, wrestler
 October 17 – Dora Madison, actress
 October 18
 Brittney Griner, basketball player
 Carly Schroeder, actress
 October 19
 Jessica Meuse, singer
 Samantha Munro, actress
 Ciara Renée, actress
 October 20 – Galadriel Stineman, actress
 October 22
 Ashley Fiolek, motocross racer
 Jonathan Lipnicki, actor
 October 23 – Stevie Brock, singer
 October 24 – Kirby Bliss Blanton, actress
 October 25
 Austin Peralta, jazz musician and composer
 Ryan Preece, racing driver
 October 29 – Carlson Young, actress
 October 31
 JID, rapper
 Lil' JJ, actor and comedian

November

 November 2 – Kendall Schmidt, actor, singer, and guitarist
 November 8 – SZA, R&B singer
 November 9 
 Hodgy, rapper
 Christine Michael, football player
 November 10 – Aron Jóhannsson, soccer player
 November 12 – Adrianna Franch, soccer player
 November 13 – Kathleen Herles, voice actress
 November 17 – Shanica Knowles, actress and singer
 November 20 – Zack Martin, football player
 November 21 – Nickmercs, livestreamer
 November 22 – Brock Osweiler, football player
 November 23 – Nick Williams, football player
 November 24 – Sarah Hyland, actress
 November 25 –
 Stephanie Hsu, actress
 Rye Rye, rapper, dancer, and actress
 November 27 – Blackbear, hip hop musician, singer, composer, and record producer
 November 28 – Sena Acolatse, ice hockey player
 November 29 – Sheldon Richardson, football player

December

 December 1 – Chanel Iman, model
 December 6 – Elizabeth Bruenig, journalist
 December 10 – Terrell Sinkfield, football player
 December 11 – Derrick Nix, basketball player
 December 17 – Graham Rogers, actor
 December 18 – Sierra Kay, singer/songwriter, model, and lead vocalist for VersaEmerge
 December 20
 JoJo, singer and actress
 Trainwreckstv, Twitch streamer
 December 22 – Josef Newgarden, race car driver
 December 23 – Anna Maria Perez de Tagle, actress
 December 24 – Marcus Jordan, basketball player
 December 26
 Jon Bellion, singer
 Andy Biersack, singer/songwriter and frontman for Black Veil Brides
 December 27 – Zelina Vega, wrestler and actress
 December 28 – David Archuleta, singer

Deaths

January

 January 2 – Alan Hale Jr., American actor (b. 1921)
 January 4 – Doc Edgerton, American electrical engineer (b. 1903)
 January 5 – Arthur Kennedy, American actor (b. 1914)
 January 7 – Bronko Nagurski, Canadian-American football player (b. 1908)
 January 9 
 Northern Calloway, American actor (b. 1948)
 Spud Chandler, American baseball player (b. 1907)
 January 10 – Lyle R. Wheeler, American art director (b. 1905)
 January 18
 Rusty Hamer, American actor (b. 1948)
 Edouard Izac, American naval officer (b. 1891)
 January 19 – Arthur Goldberg, Supreme Court justice (b. 1908)
 January 20 – Barbara Stanwyck, American actress (b. 1907)
 January 22 – Roman Vishniac, Russian-American photographer (b. 1897)
 January 23 – Allen Collins, American musician (b. 1952)
 January 24 – Madge Bellamy, American actress (b. 1899)
 January 25 – Ava Gardner, American actress (b. 1922)
 January 26 – Lewis Mumford, American historian of science (b. 1895)
 January 27 – Helen Jerome Eddy, American actress (b. 1897)
 January 28 – Joseph Payne Brennan, American writer (b. 1918)
 January 30 – John Rogers Cox, American painter (b. 1915)

February

 February 2 – Mel Lewis, American jazz musician (b. 1929)
 February 3 – Jane Novak, American actress (b. 1896)
 February 5 – Joseph J. Nazzaro, Air Force general (b. 1913)
 February 7 
 Nazarena of Jesus, American Roman Catholic nun and missionary (b. 1907)
 Jimmy Van Heusen, American composer (b. 1913)
 February 8 – Del Shannon, American musician and singer (b. 1934)
 February 9 – Una Hanbury, British born sculptor (b. 1904)
 February 10 – Bill Sherwood, American musician and director (b. 1952)
 February 13 – Angela Gregory, American sculptor and professor (b. 1903)
 February 14 – Jean Wallace, American actress (b. 1923)
 February 15 – Henry Brandon, German Born actor (b. 1912)
 February 16 – Keith Haring, American pop artist (b. 1958)
 February 17 – Erik Rhodes, American actor (b. 1906)
 February 19 – Otto E. Neugebauer, Austrian-born American mathematician and historian of science (b. 1899)
 February 22 – Stephen W. Burns, American actor (b. 1954)
 February 23 – James M. Gavin, American army general (b. 1907)
 February 24 
 Tony Conigliaro, American baseball player (b. 1945)
 Malcolm Forbes, American publisher (b. 1919)
 Johnnie Ray, American singer (b. 1927)
 February 27 – Nahum Norbert Glatzer, American scholar (b. 1903)

March

 March 4 – Hank Gathers, American basketball player (b. 1967)
 March 5 – Gary Merrill, American actor (b. 1915)
 March 6
 William Raborn, American Navy officer (b. 1905)
 Joe Sewell, American baseball player (b. 1898)
 March 12 – Gene Klein, American businessman (b. 1921)
 March 13 – Bruno Bettelheim, American child psychologist (b. 1903)
 March 14 – Harold Medina, American lawyer, teacher, and judge (b. 1888)
 March 15 – Tom Harmon, American football player and broadcaster (b. 1919)
 March 18 – Robin Harris, American actor, comedian and voice artist (b. 1953)
 March 19
 Neta Lohnes Frazier, American children's author (b. 1890)
 Andrew Wood, American musician (b. 1966)
 March 24 – Ray Goulding, American comedian (b. 1922)
 March 26 – Halston, American fashion designer (b. 1932)
 March 30 – Harry Bridges, Australian-born union leader (b. 1901)

April

 April 3
 Edna Reindel, Surrealist and American Regionalist painter and sculptor (b. 1894)
 Sarah Vaughan, American jazz vocalist (b. 1924)
 April 7 – Ronald Evans, American astronaut (b. 1933)
 April 8 – Ryan White, American AIDS activist (b. 1971)
 April 10 – Fortune Gordien, American Olympic athlete (b. 1922)
 April 15 – Greta Garbo, Swedish-born actress (b. 1905)
 April 17 – Ralph Abernathy, American civil rights activist (b. 1926)
 April 18
 Gory Guerrero, American wrestler and father of Eddie Guerrero (b. 1921)
 Robert D. Webb, American film director (b. 1903)
 April 22 – Albert Salmi, American actor (b. 1928)
 April 23 – Paulette Goddard, American actress (b. 1910)
 April 25 – Dexter Gordon, American jazz saxophonist (b. 1923)
 April 27 – Bella Spewack, American songwriter (b. 1899)
 April 30 – Joseph E. Johnson, American government official (b. 1895)

May

 May 1 – Sunset Carson, American actor (b. 1920)
 May 2
 William L. Dawson, American composer, choir director, and professor (b. 1899)
 David Rappaport, American actor (b. 1951)
 May 6 – Charles Farrell, American actor (b. 1900)
 May 10
 Susan Oliver, American actress (b. 1932)
 Walker Percy, American writer (b. 1916)
 May 14 – Franklyn Seales, American actor (b. 1952)
 May 16
 Sammy Davis Jr., American actor, dancer, and singer (b. 1925)
 Jim Henson, American puppeteer and filmmaker (b. 1936)
 May 18 – Jill Ireland, English actress (b. 1936)
 May 22 – Rocky Graziano, American boxer (b. 1919)
 May 25 – Vic Tayback, American actor (b. 1930)
 May 30 – Ora Mendelsohn Rosen, biomedical researcher (b. 1935)

June

 June 2 – Rex Harrison, English actor (b. 1908)
 June 3 – Robert Noyce, American businessman and inventor (b. 1927)
 June 4 
 Stiv Bators, singer (The Dead Boys) (b. 1949)
 Jack Gilford, American actor (b. 1908)
 June 7 – Barbara Baxley, American actress (b. 1923)
 June 12 – Laura Scales, American educator (b. 1879)
 June 14 – Philip Henry Bridenbaugh, American football player and coach (b. 1890)
 June 20 – Ina Balin, American actress (b. 1937)
 June 22 – Mollie Moon, American civil rights activist (b. 1912)
 June 27 – William Edward Davies, American geologist and speleologist (b. 1917)
 June 29 – Irving Wallace, American writer (b. 1916)

July

 July 4 – Phil Boggs, American Olympic diver (b. 1949)
 July 7 – Bill Cullen, American game show host (b. 1920)
 July 8 – Howard Duff, American actor (b. 1913)
 July 13 – Lois Moran, American actress (b. 1909)
 July 18 – Karl Menninger, American psychiatrist (b. 1893)
 July 19 – Eddie Quillan, American actor (b. 1907)
 July 21 – Joe Turner, American jazz pianist (b. 1907)
 July 26 – Brent Mydland, American keyboard player (b. 1952)

August

 August 6 – Lemuel C. Shepherd, Jr., 4-star general of the American Marine Corps (b. 1896)
 August 9 – Dorothy Appleby, American film actress (b. 1906)
 August 12 – Dorothy Mackaill, British-born American actress (b. 1903)
 August 17 – Pearl Bailey, American actress and singer (b. 1918)
 August 18 – B. F. Skinner, American psychologist (b. 1904)
 August 23 – David Rose, British-born American songwriter, composer, and arranger (b. 1910)
 August 25 – Willard L. Beaulac, American diplomat (b. 1899)
 August 27
 Raymond St. Jacques, American actor (b. 1930)
 Stevie Ray Vaughan, American guitarist (b. 1954)
 August 28 – Larry Jackson, American baseball player and politician (b. 1931)

September

 September 4 – Irene Dunne, American actress (b. 1898)
 September 6 – Tom Fogerty, American musician (b. 1941)
 September 14 – Lotus Long, American actress (b. 1909)
 September 19 – Hermes Pan, American choreographer (b. 1910)
 September 22 – John A. Danaher, American politician (b. 1899)
 September 23 – Betty Warfel, American professional baseball player (b. 1928)

October

 October 1 – Curtis LeMay, United States Air Force general (b. 1906)
 October 7 – Grim Natwick, American animator (b. 1890)
 October 8 – William H. Harrison, American politician (b. 1896)
 October 13 – Douglas Edwards, American television news anchor (b. 1917)
 October 14 – Leonard Bernstein, American composer and conductor (b. 1918)
 October 15 – Helen Bray, American actress (b. 1889)
 October 16 – Art Blakey, American jazz musician (b. 1919)
 October 20 – Joel McCrea, American actor (b. 1905)
 October 26 – William S. Paley, American media executive (b. 1901)
 October 27
 Xavier Cugat, Catalan-born bandleader (b. 1900)
 Elliott Roosevelt, American writer (b. 1910)
 October 29 
 Herbert Brodkin, film and television director and producer (b. 1912)
 William French Smith, American lawyer and former Attorney General of the United States (b. 1917)

November

 November 3 – Mary Martin, American actress and singer (b. 1913)
 November 5 – Meir Kahane, American rabbi and political figure (b. 1932)
 November 11 – Elliott Chaze, American journalist and novelist (b. 1915)
 November 12 – Eve Arden, American actress (b. 1908)
 November 17 – Robert Hofstadter, American physicist, Nobel Prize laureate (b. 1915)
 November 27 – David White, American actor (b. 1916)

December

 December 2
 Aaron Copland, American composer (b. 1900)
 Robert Cummings, American actor (b. 1910)
 December 7 
 Joan Bennett, American actress (b. 1910)
 Dee Clark, American soul singer (b. 1938)
 December 8 – Martin Ritt, American film director (b. 1914)
 December 9 – Mike Mazurki, American actor and wrestler (b. 1909)
 December 10 – Armand Hammer, American business tycoon (b. 1898)
 December 13 – Alice Marble, American tennis champion (b. 1913)
 December 15 – Edmund Parker, Kenpo founder (b. 1931)
 December 16 – Douglas Campbell, World War I pilot (b. 1896)
 December 18 – Anne Revere, American actress (b. 1903)
 December 20 – Elmo Tanner, American singer and whistler (b. 1910)
 December 28
 Kiel Martin, American actor (b. 1944)
 Warren Skaaren, American screenwriter and film producer (b. 1946)
 December 31 – George Allen, American football coach (b. 1918)

Undated
 Caroline F. Ware, historian and New Deal activist (b. 1899)

See also
 1990 in American television
 List of American films of 1990
 Timeline of United States history (1990–2009)

References

External links
 

 
1990s in the United States
United States
United States
Years of the 20th century in the United States